Unicell or Unicel may refer to:

 Unicel, an American brand of mobile-phone service
 Unicell Limited, a Canadian company that worked with Purolator on a prototype electric vehicle
 Unicell, a mobile network operator in Maine acquired by Powertel in 1993

See also
 Unicellular organism, a living organism made up of one cell